One Bright Shining Moment: The Forgotten Summer of George McGovern is a 2005 documentary film directed by Stephen Vittoria.

Overview
The film chronicles the unsuccessful 1972 presidential campaign of Democratic South Dakota Senator George McGovern. Narrated by journalist Amy Goodman, the film features appearances from McGovern himself, as well as his 1972 campaign manager and former Colorado Senator Gary Hart, feminist activist Gloria Steinem, historian Howard Zinn, author Gore Vidal, and satirist Dick Gregory.

The film won the Jury Prize Award for Best Documentary Feature at the 2005 Sarasota Film Festival.

References

External links

Documentary films about American politicians
Documentary films about elections in the United States
2005 films
2005 documentary films
2000s English-language films
2000s American films